Thirumakalam Mahakalanathar Temple(திருமாகாளம் மகாகாளநாதர் கோயில்) is a Hindu temple located at Thirumakalam in Tiruvarur district, Tamil Nadu, India. The presiding deity is Shiva. He is called as Mahakalanathar. His consort is known as Bayakshambikai.

Significance 
It is one of the shrines of the 275 Paadal Petra Sthalams - Shiva Sthalams glorified in the early medieval Tevaram poems by Tamil Saivite Nayanar Tirugnanasambandar.

Literary Mention 

Tirugnanasambandar describes the features of the deity as:

References

External links 
 
 

Shiva temples in Tiruvarur district
Padal Petra Stalam